Midway Aerodrome  is located adjacent to Midway, British Columbia, Canada.

History
The aerodrome was listed as an "all way field" with dimensions listed as follows:

References

Registered aerodromes in British Columbia
Boundary Country
Royal Canadian Air Force stations
Military airbases in British Columbia
Military history of British Columbia